Joshua Levs, commonly known as Josh Levs, is an American broadcast journalist.  Born in Albany, New York, he reports for the CNN news television network.

Biography
Levs was raised in a Conservative Jewish family in Albany, New York and received his undergraduate degree from Yale University.  He worked for NPR in Atlanta before moving to CNN.

Levs has spent more than 10 years at CNN, reporting across all platforms and networks.

When Levs requested extended paid parental leave from CNN's parent company Time Warner in August 2013, he was denied anything more than the two weeks of paid leave for biological fathers—much less than 10 weeks paid leave that were provided for women and for men who had babies through adoption or surrogacy.  Levs used his two paid weeks, and additionally vacation and sick days as he cared for his three children and wife, who had developed severe preeclampsia. Levs filed a charge with the Equal Employment Opportunity Commission against Time Warner demanding equitable paid paternity leave, essentially winning the claim a year later.

Levs is married to Melanie Lasoff; they have three children.

Parenting book
According to the Today Show, Levs turned his paternity leave experience into a 2015 book, All In: How Our Work-First Culture Fails Dads, Families, and Businesses--And How We Can Fix It Together, asserting the need for more paternity leave in view of  changes in family dynamics that have occurred over the last fifty years.

See also
Thornton, Terri, "CNN's Joshua Levs Uses Social Media Savvy in Hard, Soft News", PBS, December 16, 2010. (WebCite archive)
"TEDxEmory - Josh Levs - Breaking the system to achieve the impossible", TED talks video, posted August 12, 2011. (WebCite archive)

References

External links
 Josh Levs Blog at CNN
 
 

American radio reporters and correspondents
American male journalists
Jewish American journalists
American television reporters and correspondents
Peabody Award winners
Yale University alumni
Living people
CNN people
Year of birth missing (living people)
21st-century American Jews